The Alley Glacier is a glacier in Antarctica that drains the north slopes of Britannia Range in the vicinity of Ward Tower and flows north to Darwin Glacier.  It is separated from Gaussiran Glacier by a series of large rock buttresses, including Robertson Buttress.

It was named by the Advisory Committee on Antarctic Names after Richard Alley of the Department of Geosciences, Pennsylvania State University, a United States Antarctic Program glaciologist who specialized in the study of ice streams of the West Antarctic Ice Sheet.

See also
 List of glaciers in the Antarctic
 Glaciology

References

 

Glaciers of Oates Land